Jehu Beezye Chiapas Pérez (born 3 October 1985) is a Mexican former professional footballer who played as a midfielder.

Club career
Chiapas joined the Pumas youth system and worked his way through the ranks to debut in 2005; in 2011 he transferred to San Luis FC. He usually plays in the left flank of the defense and this season would try to become a regular starter.

Honours
UNAM
Mexican Primera División: Clausura 2009, Clausura 2011

External links
 
 

1985 births
Living people
Footballers from Veracruz
People from Martínez de la Torre
Mexican people of Guatemalan descent
Sportspeople of Guatemalan descent
Association football midfielders
Mexican footballers
Mexican expatriate footballers
Club Universidad Nacional footballers
San Luis F.C. players
C.D. Veracruz footballers
Chiapas F.C. footballers
Cafetaleros de Chiapas footballers
Liga MX players
Segunda División B players
Mexican expatriate sportspeople in Spain
Expatriate footballers in Spain